The Green Tree Tavern, also known as the Marlborough Inn, is a historic building in the Fishtown neighborhood of Philadelphia, Pennsylvania.

The building was added to the National Register of Historic Places in 1980.

The tavern had claimed to be the oldest operating tavern in Philadelphia, established in 1849, but is now closed. As of 2012, the property was occupied by a kick-boxing and martial arts studio.

References

Commercial buildings on the National Register of Historic Places in Philadelphia
Commercial buildings completed in 1845
1849 establishments in Pennsylvania
Taverns in Pennsylvania
History of Philadelphia
Bridesburg-Kensington-Richmond, Philadelphia
Drinking establishments on the National Register of Historic Places in Pennsylvania
Hotel buildings on the National Register of Historic Places in Pennsylvania